The Mystery of Pine Creek Camp is a 1913 American silent film produced by Gene Gauntier Feature Players and distributed by Warner's Features. It was directed by Sidney Olcott with himself, Gene Gauntier, Jack J. Clark and Arthur Donaldson in the leading roles.

Cast
 Gene Gauntier  
 Jack J. Clark  
 Sidney Olcott 
 Arthur Donaldson

Production notes
 The film was shot in Jacksonville, Fla.

External links

 The Mystery of Pine Creek Camp website dedicated to Sidney Olcott

1913 films
American silent short films
Films shot in Jacksonville, Florida
Films directed by Sidney Olcott
American mystery films
American black-and-white films
1910s mystery films
1910s American films
Silent mystery films